Dysoxylum excelsum is a tree in the family Meliaceae. The specific epithet  is from the Latin meaning "tall".

Description
The sweetly scented flowers are cream-coloured or pinkish white.

Distribution and habitat
Dysoxylum excelsum is found in Sri Lanka, Nepal, northeast India, southern China, Indochina and throughout Malesia to the Solomon Islands. Its habitat is rain forest from sea-level to  altitude.

References

excelsum
Trees of China
Flora of tropical Asia
Plants described in 1825